Brian Barry,  (7 August 1936 – 10 March 2009) was a moral and political philosopher. He was educated at the Queen's College, Oxford, obtaining the degrees of B.A. and D.Phil. under the direction of H. L. A. Hart.

Along with David Braybrooke, Richard E. Flathman, Felix Oppenheim, and Abraham Kaplan, he is widely credited with having fused analytic philosophy and political science. Barry also fused political theory and social choice theory and was a persistent critic of public choice theory.

Life
During his early career, Barry held teaching posts at the University of Birmingham, Keele University and the University of Southampton. In 1965 he was appointed a teaching fellow at University College, Oxford and then Nuffield College. In 1969 he became a professor at Essex University.

Barry was Lieber Professor Emeritus of Political Philosophy at Columbia University and Professor Emeritus of Political Science at the London School of Economics. He was awarded the Johan Skytte Prize in Political Science in 2001. Barry also taught at the University of Chicago, in the departments of philosophy and political science. During this time he edited the journal Ethics, helping raise its publication standards. Under his editorship, it became perhaps the leading journal for moral and political philosophy.

He was elected a Fellow of the American Academy of Arts and Sciences in 1978. Barry was a Distinguished Supporter of the British Humanist Association, and was awarded an honorary doctorate by the University of York in 2006.

In 2014, the British Academy, in partnership with Cambridge University Press and the British Journal of Political Science, founded an annual prize in political science in his honour: the Brian Barry Prize in Political Science.

Selected publications 
 Why Social Justice Matters (Polity 2005)
 Culture & Equality: An Egalitarian Critique of Multiculturalism (2001)
 Justice as Impartiality (1995)
 Liberty and Justice: Essays in Political Theory (1991)
 Theories of Justice (Berkeley, 1989)
 Democracy, Power, and Justice: Essays in Political Theory (Oxford, 1989)
 The Liberal Theory of Justice (1973)
 Sociologists, Economists and Democracy (1970)
 Political Argument (1965, Reissue 1990)

Further reading
 Justice & Democracy: Essays for Brian Barry, edited by Keith Dowding, Robert E. Goodin, and Carole Pateman (2004)
 Multiculturalism Reconsidered: 'Culture and Equality' and Its Critics, edited by Paul Kelly (2002)
 Impartiality, Neutrality and Justice: Re-Reading Brian Barry's 'Justice as Impartiality', edited by Paul Kelly (2001)

References

External links
Columbia profile
Obituary, The Guardian
Obituary, The Telegraph
Obituary, The Times [Archived by Wayback Machine]
The Brian Barry Literary Archive A 'work in progress' site for Brian Barry's unpublished writings.  Brian Barry, British Political Philosopher by The Editors of Encyclopædia Britannica [Archival content - originally published in the Britannica Book of the Year, originally published on 14 May 2009]Brian Barry is dead'' remembrance from Harry Brighouse on the Crooked Timber group blog.

20th-century British philosophers
21st-century British philosophers
Academics of the London School of Economics
Academics of the University of Birmingham
Academics of Keele University
Academics of the University of Southampton
Academics of the University of Essex
Alumni of The Queen's College, Oxford
British humanists
Columbia University faculty
Critics of multiculturalism
Fellows of the American Academy of Arts and Sciences
Fellows of the British Academy
British political philosophers
Scholars of nationalism
1936 births
2009 deaths
British social commentators
Fellows of Nuffield College, Oxford